Lindsay Davenport was the defending champion but lost in the second round to Natasha Zvereva.

First-seeded Steffi Graf won in the final 6–2, 7–5 against Mirjana Lučić.

Seeds
A champion seed is indicated in bold text while text in italics indicates the round in which that seed was eliminated. The top two seeds received a bye to the second round.

  Steffi Graf (champion)
  Lindsay Davenport (second round)
  Amanda Coetzer (semifinals)
  Judith Wiesner (semifinals)
  Elena Likhovtseva (second round)
  Sabine Appelmans (quarterfinals)
  Nathalie Tauziat (second round)
  Magdalena Maleeva (first round)

Draw

Final

Section 1

Section 2

External links
 1997 Internationaux de Strasbourg draw 

1997
1997 WTA Tour